Dalibor Bortňák (born 17 February 1991) is a Slovak professional ice hockey centre who is currently playing for HK Spišská Nová Ves of the Slovak Extraliga.

Career
After playing in junior level for HC Prešov and HC Bílí Tygři Liberec, Bortňák moved to the junior Canadian Hockey League where he was drafted 18th overall by the Western Hockey League's Kamloops Blazers in the 2008 CHL Import Draft. He spent three seasons with the Blazers before returning to Liberec to sign for their senior team.

Bortňák moved to HKm Zvolen of the Tipsport Liga on January 12, 2014. He then joined HC Košice for the 2015–16 season, but on February 13, 2016, he was traded to HC '05 Banská Bystrica. On September 3, 2018, Bortňák joined HK Nitra. After one season in Nitra, Bortňák returned to Košice on May 28, 2019.

Career statistics

Regular season and playoffs

International

References

External links

1991 births
Living people
Slovak ice hockey centres
Sportspeople from Prešov
Kamloops Blazers players
HC Bílí Tygři Liberec players
HC Benátky nad Jizerou players
HKM Zvolen players
HC Košice players
HC '05 Banská Bystrica players
HK Nitra players
HC Slovan Bratislava players
HK Poprad players
EHC Black Wings Linz players
HK Spišská Nová Ves players
Slovak expatriate ice hockey players in Canada
Slovak expatriate ice hockey players in the Czech Republic
Expatriate ice hockey players in Austria
Slovak expatriate sportspeople in Austria